Helioprosopa velada is a species of tachinid flies in the genus Helioprosopa of the family Tachinidae.

External links

Tachinidae
Insects described in 1964